Chadwick Modular Seating is a modular sofa that is composed of one or more sections that can be arranged to create long, contiguous seating surfaces for offices and homes. Multiple section shapes were produced in many fabrics and colors. Sections were available in straight, wedge and elbow shapes.

Don Chadwick designed the system in 1974 for Herman Miller.

See also 
 Harvey Probber#Modular seating

References 

Furniture
Chairs
Couches
Seats